Paul Edward Tatum (April 2, 1955 – November 3, 1996) was an American expatriate businessman assassinated in a Moscow metro station close to his hotel.

Tatum was operating a Hotel Joint Venture with a Chechen businessman named Umar Dzhabrailov; the venture included international hotel Radisson.

Tatum founded the Americom Business Centre and became part-owner of the Radisson Slavyanskaya Hotel, an upscale hotel in Moscow, which catered to foreign businessmen and high-end guests. On April 7, 1995, Tatum was barred from entering the hotel by his estranged business partners in a battle for control of the business.

Tatum was born in Edmond, Oklahoma and travelled to Russia in 1985, involving himself in various business activities. He reportedly knew President Clinton, who was a regular guest of his hotel while visiting Russia on state visits. During the attempted coup in Russia in the summer of 1991, Tatum had supplied president Boris Yeltsin's only link to the outside world by giving him satellite linkage from a government building in Moscow, which was surrounded by army units trying to overthrow his fledgling democratic government.

Tatum had numerous disputes with his hotel partner Umar Dzhabrailov, at one point taking out a full page ad in a local Moscow newspaper alleging Dzhabrailov was blackmailing Tatum and trying to force him out of the hotel joint venture. A few weeks later he was gunned down and shot 11 times in the head and neck. Shortly after Tatum's death, Dzhabrailov and the Moscow city government quickly took over complete control of the hotel joint venture.

Carol Williams investigated the Tatum murder for the Los Angeles Times and after concluding it had likely been a contract killing, she got a call from someone who told her it was "unhealthy to pursue certain avenues of inquiry".

Tatum was interred in Kuntsevo Cemetery, Moscow.

References

External links
BBC report on Russian contract killings
Life and death of Paul Tatum

1955 births
1996 deaths
American people murdered abroad
People from Edmond, Oklahoma
Deaths by firearm in Russia
People murdered by Russian-speaking organized crime
Burials at Kuntsevo Cemetery
People murdered in Russia
Assassinations in Russia